Pedro Soares Pinto (born July 1, 1977) is a Portuguese journalist, businessman and politician of the Chega party and a member of the Assembly of the Republic for Faro since 2022.

Biography
Pinto was born in Lisbon in 1977. He studied international relations at the Universidade Autónoma de Lisboa. After graduating, he worked as a journalist and became a director for Ruedo Ibérico magazine. He later founded an events organizing business.

He was initially active in the CDS – People's Party before leaving to join Chega in 2019 and became Chega's district secretary in Beja where he was elected as a municipal councilor in 2020 before transferring to Faro.

For the 2022 Portuguese legislative election, he contested the Faro constituency and was elected to the Assembly of the Republic. In the Assembly he has focused on matters related to immigration and the COVID-19 policy. He is also president of the Chega parliamentary group.

References

1977 births
Portuguese politicians
People from Lisbon
21st-century Portuguese politicians
Chega politicians
Members of the Assembly of the Republic (Portugal)
Living people